Camissonia, sometimes commonly known as sun cup or sundrop, is a genus of annual and perennial plants in the evening primrose family Onagraceae. A total of 12 species are known, nearly all from western North America, especially in the California Floristic Province, but also one from South America. Previous circumscriptions of the genus had recognized up to 62 species before it was split among other closely related genera.

The flowers generally open at dawn and are yellow. They are usually cup-shaped, thus the common name.

Formerly included in Oenothera, the species of Camissonia are distinguished by having a club- or head-shaped stigma, instead of the 4-part-divided stigma of Oenothera or Clarkia.

Camissonia species are used as food plants by the larvae of some Lepidoptera species including Schinia cupes and Schinia deserticola, both of which feed on C. claviformis, the latter exclusively.

The genus is named after the botanist Adelbert von Chamisso.

Selected species
According to The Plant List, the genus includes the following accepted species:

Camissonia andina (Nutt.) P.H.Raven
Camissonia bairdii S.L.Welsh	
Camissonia benitensis P.H.Raven
Camissonia breviflora (Torr. & A.Gray) P.H.Raven	
Camissonia campestris (Greene) P.H.Raven (Mojave suncup)
Camissonia contorta (Douglas) Kearney
Camissonia dentata(Cav.) Reiche
Camissonia dominguez-escalantorum N.D.Atwood, L.C.Higgins & S.L.Welsh	
Camissonia graciliflora (Hook. & Arn.) P.H.Raven	
Camissonia hilgardii (Greene) P.H.Raven	
Camissonia integrifolia P.H.Raven
Camissonia kernensis (Munz) P.H.Raven
Camissonia lacustris P.H.Raven
Camissonia ovata (Nutt. ex Torr. & A.Gray) P.H.Raven
Camissonia palmeri (S.Watson) P.H.Raven	
Camissonia parvula (Nutt.) P.H.Raven
Camissonia pubens (S.Watson) P.H.Raven
Camissonia pusilla P.H.Raven
Camissonia sierrae P.H.Raven
Camissonia strigulosa (Fisch. & C.A.Mey.) P.H.Raven	
Camissonia subacaulis (Pursh) P.H.Raven
Camissonia tanacetifolia (Torr. & A.Gray) P.H.Raven

References

Jepson Flora Project: Camissonia

 
Onagraceae genera
Adelbert von Chamisso